The genus Nestor is one of the two extant genera of the parrot family Strigopidae. Together with the kākāpō, and the extinct parrots in the genus Nelepsittacus, they form the parrot superfamily Strigopoidea. The genus Nestor contains two extant parrot species from New Zealand and two extinct species from Norfolk Island, Australia and Chatham Island, New Zealand, respectively. All species are large stocky birds with short squarish tails. A defining characteristic of the genus is the tongue, which is tipped with a hair-like fringe. The superficial resemblance of this tongue to that of lorikeets has led some taxonomists to consider the two groups closely related, but DNA evidence shows they are not.

Classification
All four species in the genus Nestor are thought to stem from a 'proto-kākā', dwelling in the forests of New Zealand 5 million years ago. The closest living relative of the genus is the kākāpō (Strigops habroptilus).  Together, they form the Strigopoidea, which comprises an ancient group that split off from all other Psittaciformes before their radiation.

Species
There are two surviving species and at least one well documented extinct species in the genus Nestor. Very little is known about the fourth, the Chatham kākā, which may have been conspecific with another kākā species.

 Kea, Nestor notabilis
 Kākā, Nestor meridionalis
 North Island kākā, Nestor meridionalis septentrionalis
 South Island kākā, Nestor meridionalis meridionalis
 †Norfolk kākā, Nestor productus (extinct)
 †Chatham kākā, Nestor chathamensis (extinct)

Status

Of the four species, the Norfolk kākā and Chatham kākā became extinct in recent history. The last known individual of the Norfolk kākā died in captivity in London sometime after 1851, and only between seven and 20 skins survive. The Chatham kākā became extinct in pre-European times, after Polynesians arrived at the island, between 1550 and 1700, and is only known from subfossil bones.  The mainland kākā is listed as endangered, and the kea is listed as vulnerable.

References

 
Bird genera
Parrots of Oceania
Taxa named by René Lesson